Aureibacillus  is a Gram-positive, strictly aerobic, rod-shaped, spore-forming and motile genus of bacteria from the family of Bacillaceae with one known species (Aureibacillus halotolerans). Aureibacillus halotolerans has been isolated from sediments of the northern Okinawa Trough.

References

Bacillaceae
Bacteria genera
Monotypic bacteria genera
Bacteria described in 2015